The 2019 Star FM Music Awards were held on February 1, 2019, at Zimbali Gardens in Harare, Zimbabwe. The awards identify musical excellence, providing a multifaceted celebration of the rich cultural diversity of Zimbabwean music. 

The 'Tsvigiri' singer took home five awards in the following categories: 
Best Afro Pop Song, Best Collaboration, Best Male Artist, Best Album and Most Played Song.

Janet Manyowa and Enzo Ishall won two awards each. The former emerged tops in the Best Gospel Song and Best Female Artist categories while Enzo Ishal triumphed in the Best Newcomer and Best Zimdancehall categories. Other winners with one award each are Winky D, Novuyo Sea Girl, sungura artist Alick Macheso, Jah Signal, Takura, DJ Tamuka and Jah Signal. The awards featured performances from Jah Prayzah among others.

The ceremony was sponsored by Impala Car Rentals. It celebrated Zimbabwean talent across 16 award categories, including Best Male, Best Female, Best Song and Best Collaboration. The nominees were revealed on the 22nd of December 2018 October in Harare.

Winners and nominees

Song of the Year
Jah Signal - "Sweetie"
Enzo Ishal – "Kanjiva"
Ex Q ft Freeman HKD – "Nzenza"
Nutty O – "Boom Shelele"
Baba Harare – "The Reason Why"

Best Male Act
Ex Q
 Enzo Ishal
 Jah Prayzah
 Killer T

Best Female Act
Janet Manyowa
 Tamy Moyo
 Ammara Brown
 Shashl
 Cindy Munyavi

Best Duo/Group
N.X.T
 Diamond Boyz

Best Diaspora Act
Kazz A.K.A Mr Boomslang
 Dizzy Dee
 Mkhululi Bhebhe
 Daddy Don
 Vimbayi Zimuto

Best Newcomer
Enzo Ishall
Novuyo Seagirl
Baba Harare
Lloyd Soul
Uncle Epatan

Best Collaboration
Ex Q (featuring Freeman) – "Nzenza" 
Jah Signal (featuring Nicholas Zakaria) – "Unovashungurudza"
Ex Q (featuring Jah Prayzah & DJ Tamuka) – "Pahukama"
Winky D (featuring Vabati va Jehova) – "Ngirozi"
Tamy (featuring Nutty O) – "Lay it Down"

Best Producer 
DJ Tamuka
Oskid
Reverb 7
Chiweddar

Most played
Nzenza

People's Choice Award
Winky D

References

External links
Website
Star FM Music Awards Winners 2019

2019 music awards
Star FM Music Awards
2019 in Africa